Lee-on-The Solent to Itchen Estuary is a  biological and geological Site of Special Scientific Interest which stretches along the coast between Southampton and Gosport in Hampshire. It is a Geological Conservation Review site.  It is part of Solent and Southampton Water Ramsar site and  Special Protection Area, and of Solent Maritime Special Area of Conservation. Three areas are Local Nature Reserves, Chessel Bay, Hook with Warsash and Mercury Marshes. One area is Hamble Common Camp, a Scheduled Monument.

This site is mainly intertidal muds, and there are also areas of saltmarsh, vegetated shingle, reedbeds, deciduous woodland and marshy grassland. It is outstanding for nationally scarce coastal plants, internationally important for dark-bellied geese, and nationally important for eight other species of birds, including great crested grebe and ringed plover. The site is also important for Palaeolithic artefacts and the fossils of Eocene birds.

References

Sites of Special Scientific Interest in Hampshire
Geological Conservation Review sites
Ramsar sites in England
Special Protection Areas in England
Special Areas of Conservation in England